Pentatone (stylized as PENTATONE) is an international classical music label located in Baarn, Netherlands.

History
Three former executives of Philips Classics, Giel Bessels, Dirk van Dijk and Job Maarse, established the label in 2001.  The name comes from the words penta (five) and tone (sound), meaning five channels of sound. The label is renowned for its high-resolution multichannel surround sound recordings which are released in the Super Audio CD format. In January 2002, Pentatone recorded the official music which was performed during the wedding ceremony of the Dutch crown prince Willem-Alexander and Máxima Zorreguieta.  The album, “The Music from the Royal Wedding”, sold more than 75,000 copies, thereby attaining the unique “triple platinum” status.

The label has also licensed recordings made by other labels such as Philips Classics and Deutsche Grammophon. Among these are some from the 1970s which were originally recorded for 4-channel quadraphonic sound. Pentatone has remastered them for re-release and presented them in surround sound for the first time. All Pentatone's hybrid Super Audio CD discs can also be heard in 2-channel stereo on conventional compact disc players.

In 2013, a new management team joined Pentatone and the label expanded to multiple formats releases, including regular cd, vinyl, and all formats for streaming and downloads. The first vinyl was released in 2017 as a luxury 3LP edition. The label decided to honour Julia Fischer's Bach violin solo recordings (originally released by the label in 2005).

In April 2022, Pentatone appointed Sean Hickey as managing director, succeeding Simon M Eder. The following month it was announced that Pentatone had been acquired by the San Francisco Conservatory of Music.

Awards 

In 2004, the label received a Grammy Award for their recording of Peter and the Wolf, narrated by Sophia Loren, Bill Clinton and Mikhail Gorbachev, where the story is told from the perspective of the wolf and has the theme of letting animals live in peace.  Other award-winning issues have included John Corigliano's The Ghosts of Versailles, part of the American Opera Series, which won multiple awards, including the 59th Grammy Award as Best Opera Recording and Best Engineered Album.

In 2019 Pentatone's premiere recording of the Mason Bates opera “The (R)evolution of Steve Jobs” won the Best Opera Recording at the 61st Grammy Awards. Among the winners were composer Mason Bates, librettist Mark Campbell, the Santa Fe Opera, conductor Michael Christie, and the cast, which included Sasha Cooke, Jessica E. Jones, Edward Parks, Garrett Sorenson, Wei Wu, and Elizabeth Ostrow. The opera was nominated for Best Contemporary Composition but lost to the Kernis Violin Concerto.

In 2019, the label was awarded Label of the Year by the Gramophone Magazine. In 2020, Pentatone won the title of Label of the Year in the International Classical Music Awards.

Artists 

Piano

 Mari Kodama
 Martin Helmchen
 Min Young Kang
 Denis Kozhukhin
 Pierre-Laurent Aimard
 Nareh Argamanian
 Momo Kodama
 Sa Chen
 Francesco Piemontesi
 Inon Barnatan
 Kirill Kuzmin
 Saskia Giorgini
 Maxim Bernard
 Paul Rivinius
 Yefim Bronfman
 Tamara Stefanovich
 Lars Vogt
 Lara Downes

Cello
 Johannes Moser
 Matt Haimovitz
 Alisa Weilerstein

Violin
 Arabella Steinbacher
 Julia Fischer
 Leticia Moreno
 Jesus Rodolfo
 Chloe Chua

Guitar

 Sean Shibe

Clarinet

 Annelien Van Wauwe
Flute

 Ana de la Vega

Mandolin

 Alon Sariel

Harpsichordists

 Francesco Corti
 Andrea Buccarella

Mezzo-Soprano
 Alice Coote
 Ann Hallenberg
 Magdalena Kozena
 Anna Lucia Richter
 Sasha Cooke
 Elisabeth Kulman
 Magdalena Kožená

Soprano
 Lisa Delan
 Anna Lucia Richter
 Chen Reiss
 Sondra Radvanovsky
 Kathryn Lewek 
 Melody Moore
Francesca Aspromonte
Hanna-Elisabeth Müller
Lisette Oropesa
Christina Landshamer

Tenor
 Christian Elsner
 Piotr Beczala
 Michael Fabiano
 Stefano Secco
 René Barbera
 Ian Bostridge
 Javier Camarena

Baritone
 John Chest
 Lester Lynch
Bass-baritone

 Adam Plachetka

Countertenor 
 Bejun Mehta
 Franco Fagioli
 Tim Mead

Ensembles
 Calder Quartet
 Calefax
 Signum Quartet
 Emerson String Quartet
 Mirò Quartet
 Bastarda Trio
 Música Temprana
 cantoLX
 Ruisi Quartet
 Quatuor Diotima

Choir
 South Dakota Chorale
 Kup Taldea
 Cappella Amsterdam
 The Clarion Choir

Conductors
 Andres Orozco-Estrada
 Andrew Manze
 Diego Fasolis
 David Bates
 Marc Albrecht
 Marek Janowski
 Vladimir Jurowski
 Jakub Hrusa
 Kazuki Yamada
 Gustavo Gimeno
 Lawrance Foster
 Kazuki Yamada
 Kent Nagano
 Carlo Conti
 Roderick Cox
 Riccardo Frizza
 Semyon Bychkov
 Simon Murphy
 Mikhail Pletnev
 Sir Neville Marriner
 Yakov Kreizberg
 Philippe Herreweghe
 Jonathan Nott
 Herbert Blomstedt
 Christoph Eschenbach
 Daniel Reuss
 Daniel Oren
 Rene Jacobs
 Rafael Payare

Orchestras
 Rundfunk-Sinfonieorchester Berlin
 Luxembourg Philharmonic Orchestra
 Nederlands Philharmonisch Orkest
 Russian National Orchestra
 NDR Radiophilharmonie
 WDR Symphony Orchestra Cologne
 hr-Sinfonieorchester
 Houston Symphony
 Oregon Symphony
 Orchestre de la Suisse Romande
 State Academic Symphony Orchestra of Russia ''Evgeny Svetlanov”
 New Dutch Academy
 Il pomo d’oro
 Czech Philharmonic
 Washington National Opera
 Basque National Orchestra
 Lyric Opera of Chicago 
 Coro & Orquestra Gulbenkian
 Holland Baroque
 Gewandhausorchester Leipzig
 The Dresdner Philharmonie
 Akademie für Alte Musik Berlin
 B'Rock Orchestra
 Orchestre symphonique de Montréal
 Singapore Symphony Orchestra
 Kammerorchester Basel

Composers
 Gordon Getty
 Jeanine Tesori
 Jake Heggie
 Jennifer Higdon
 John Corigliano
 Jimmy López Bellido
 Hilarion Alfeyev
 Luna Pearl Woolf
 Viktor Orri Árnason
 Francisco Coll
 Wim Henderickx
 Fernando Velázquez
 Klein
 Missy Mazzoli 
 Niloufar Nourbakhsh
 Tomeka Reid
 Nico Muhly
 Juri Seo
 David Balakrishnan
 Sky Macklay
 Nia Franklin
 Jennifer Jolley
 Alex Weston
 Nina Shekhar
 Texu Kim
 Caroline Shaw
 Kamala Sankaram
 Mark Campbell (librettist)
 Matt Boehler
 Gabriella Smith
 David Sanford
 David T. Little
 Nkeiru Okoye
 Jorge Sosa
 Vijay Iyer
 Roberto Sierra
 Asher Sizemore
 Tod Machover
 Laura Elise Schwendinger
 Lisa Bielawa
 Todd Boss
 Royce Vavrek
 Rene Orth
 Colleen Murphy
 Christopher Cerrone 
 John K. Samson
 Gabriel Kahane
 Andrew Marshall
 Huang Ruo
 David Henry Hwang
 Timo Andres
 Hilary Purrington
 Lembit Beecher
 Liza Balkan
 Emily Roller
 Joel Thompson 
 Gene Scheer
 Philip Glass
 Annabelle Chvostek 
 Layale Chaker
 Lewis Spratlan
 Marcos Balter
 Tamar-kali
 Osnat Netzer 
 Phonodelica
 David Lang

Catalogue series 
 Orchestre Philharmonique du Luxembourg series
 AMERICAN OPERAS Series
 Dances Series
 REMASTERED CLASSICS Philips Classics
 PENTATONE Oxingale Series
 REMASTERED CLASSICS Deutsche Grammophon
 RQR Series

References

External links 
 Official website of Pentatone
 Facebook
 Instagram
 Twitter
 LinkedIn
 YouTube

Classical music record labels
Dutch record labels
Record labels established in 2001
2001 establishments in the Netherlands